The Black Chamber (1919–1929), also known as the Cipher Bureau, was the United States' first peacetime cryptanalytic organization, and a forerunner of the National Security Agency. The only prior codes and cypher organizations maintained by the US government had been some intermittent, and always abandoned, attempts by Armed Forces branches prior to World War I.

History 

Headed by Herbert O. Yardley (1889–1958), the Black Chamber was founded in May 1919 following World War I. Yardley had commanded the U.S. Army cryptographic section of Military Intelligence (MI-8) during World War I. MI-8 was disbanded after the war. Jointly funded by the Army and the State Department, the Cipher Bureau was disguised as a New York City commercial code company; it actually produced and sold such codes for business use. Its true mission, however, was to break the communications (chiefly diplomatic) of other nations. During the Washington Naval Conference, it aided American negotiators by providing them with the decrypted traffic of many of the Conference delegations, including the Japanese.

According to intelligence historian James Bamford, the Black Chamber secured the cooperation of American telegraph companies, such as Western Union, in illegally turning over the cable traffic of foreign embassies and consulates in Washington and New York. Eventually, "almost the entire American cable industry" was part of this effort. However, these companies eventually withdrew their support—possibly spurred by the Radio Act of 1927, which broadened criminal offenses related to breaching the confidentiality of telegraph messages.

In 1929, the State Department withdrew its share of the funding, the Army declined to bear the entire load, and the Black Chamber closed down. New Secretary of State Henry L. Stimson made this decision, and years later in his memoirs made the oft-quoted comment: "Gentlemen do not read each other's mail." Stimson's ethical reservations about cryptanalysis focused on the targeting of diplomats from America's close allies, not on spying in general. Once he became Secretary of War during World War II, he and the entire US command structure relied heavily on decrypted enemy communications.

In 1931, and in need of money, Yardley wrote a book about the Cipher Bureau, titled The American Black Chamber.

The term "Black Chamber" predates Yardley's use of it in the title of his book. Codes and code breakers have been used throughout history, notably by Sir Francis Walsingham in Elizabethan England. A so-called cabinet noir was established by King Henry IV of France in 1590 as part of the Poste aux Lettres. Its mission was to open, read and reseal letters, and great expertise was developed in the restoration of broken seals. In the knowledge that mail was being opened, correspondents began to develop systems to encrypt and decrypt their letters. The breaking of these codes gave birth to modern systematic scientific code breaking. The Black Chambers survived through to the 20th century  in a variety of guises and inspired similar organisations in other countries, such as the "Secret Office" of the British Post Office and the Admiralty's Room 40 and it is within this historical framework that Yardley uses the term.

It was also used at about that time in Poland (see article on Marian Rejewski).

References

1919 establishments in the United States
Cryptography organizations
Defunct United States intelligence agencies
Government agencies established in 1919